Born Stylish is an Indian television show hosted by fashion designer and stylist Pria Kataaria Puri. It premiered on 28 November 2015 as a joint series of Colors Infinity and VH1 India. The show featured celebrity guests including Akshay Kumar, Sonakshi Sinha, Anil Kapoor, Malaika Arora Khan, Fawad Khan, Lisa Haydon, Nimrat Kaur and the finale featured Ajay Devgn.

Episodes

References

Colors Infinity original programming
2015 Indian television series debuts